Luis Leonardo Valverde Ledesma (born 7 April 2000) is a Peruvian professional footballer who plays as a defender for Primera División club Universitario.

Career
Born in Ascope, Valverde signed his first professional contract with Club Universitario de Deportes in February 2018 at the age of 17. His contract with the club was ended in August 2021.

References

2000 births
Living people
Peruvian footballers
Club Universitario de Deportes footballers
Association football defenders
Peruvian Primera División players
People from La Libertad Region